Domonique Williams (born 8 August 1994) is a Trinidad and Tobago sprinter. She competed in the women's 400 metres at the 2017 World Championships in Athletics.

References

External links

1994 births
Living people
Trinidad and Tobago female sprinters
World Athletics Championships athletes for Trinidad and Tobago
Place of birth missing (living people)